Maindy (meaning Stone House) is a district of the city of Cardiff, Wales. Its boundaries are not formally recognised by Cardiff Council, and the district falls within the Cathays ward and Gabalfa.

A notable facility in the area is the Maindy Centre consisting of a cycle track and swimming pool.  The cycle track was used in the 1958 British Empire and Commonwealth Games.

The area is served by the Capital City Green bus route.

Districts of Cardiff